Dame Margot Fonteyn, DBE (18 May 1919 – 21 February 1991), stage name of Margaret Evelyn de Arias, was an English ballerina. She spent her entire career as a dancer with the Royal Ballet, eventually being appointed Prima Ballerina Assoluta of the company by Queen Elizabeth. She joined the Vic-Wells Ballet School at the age of 14 and from 1935 was the prima ballerina of the company, which would later be called the Sadler's Wells Ballet and the Royal Ballet. In 1959, though still tied to the Royal Ballet, she was allowed to perform as a freelance dancer to enable her work as a guest dancer with various international companies. Though she officially retired in 1979, she occasionally appeared as a dancer through the late-1980s.

Stage
Unless otherwise stated, performances occurred at the Royal Opera House in Covent Garden, London. The list is incomplete.

1930s

1940s

1950s

1960s

1970s and 1980s

Television and film

References

Citations

Bibliography

Performances